Pak Chol-min may refer to:
 Pak Chol-min (judoka)
 Pak Chol-min (footballer)
 Park Chul-min, South Korean actor
 , Chairman of the Kimilsungist-Kimjongilist Youth League